Phaneroptera is an Old World genus of bush crickets in the family Tettigoniidae and is the type genus of the subfamily Phaneropterinae. It was described by Jean Guillaume Audinet-Serville in 1831 and species are recorded from Europe, Africa and Asia.

Species
The Orthoptera Species File lists: 
subgenus Erdemia Koçak & Kemal, 2009
Phaneroptera erdemi Koçak & Kemal, 2009
Phaneroptera hackeri Harz, 1988
subgenus Phaneroptera Serville, 1831
Phaneroptera acaciae Chopard, 1954
Phaneroptera albida Walker, 1869
Phaneroptera brevicauda Liu, 2011
Phaneroptera brevis (Serville, 1838)
Phaneroptera celebica (Haan, 1842)
Phaneroptera cleomis Ayal, Broza & Pener, 1974
Phaneroptera cretacea Uvarov, 1929
Phaneroptera curvata (Willemse, C., 1942)
Phaneroptera darevskii Bei-Bienko, 1966
Phaneroptera dentata (Willemse, C., 1942)
Phaneroptera falcata (Poda, 1761) - the sickle-bearing bush-cricket, from Europe and temperate Asia, this is the type species (originally as Gryllus falcata Poda)
Phaneroptera fragilis Ragge, 1960
Phaneroptera furcifera Stål, 1861
Phaneroptera gracilis Burmeister, 1838
Phaneroptera guineana Steinmann, 1966
Phaneroptera hordeifolia (Haan, 1842)
Phaneroptera jordanica Steinmann, 1966
Phaneroptera longicauda (Willemse, C., 1942)
Phaneroptera longispina Ragge, 1956
Phaneroptera maculosa Ragge, 1956
Phaneroptera magna Ragge, 1956
Phaneroptera minima Brunner von Wattenwyl, 1878
Phaneroptera myllocerca Ragge, 1956
Phaneroptera nana Fieber, 1853
Phaneroptera neglecta (Karny, 1926)
Phaneroptera nigroantennata Brunner von Wattenwyl, 1878
Phaneroptera nigropunctata Chopard, 1955
Phaneroptera okinawensis Ichikawa, 2001
Phaneroptera parva Ragge, 1956
Phaneroptera phantasma Steinmann, 1966
Phaneroptera rintjana Bei-Bienko, 1966
Phaneroptera sparsa Stal, 1857
Phaneroptera spinifera (Willemse, C., 1953)
Phaneroptera spinosa Bei-Bienko, 1954
Phaneroptera trigonia Ragge, 1957

References

External links

Phaneropterinae
Tettigoniidae genera
Orthoptera of Europe
Orthoptera of Asia
Orthoptera of Africa